The Old Portland Underground, better known locally as the Shanghai tunnels, is a group of passages in Portland, Oregon, United States, mainly underneath the Old Town Chinatown neighborhood and connecting to the main business section. The tunnels connected the basements of many hotels and taverns to the waterfront of the Willamette River. They were built to move goods from the ships docked on the Willamette to the basement storage areas, allowing businesses to avoid streetcar and train traffic on the streets when delivering their goods. 

The newspapers of the 19th century document tunnels and secret passages underground. Organized crime was the center of many of these stories. However, many of the more colorful stories claimed for the underground are controversial. Historians have stated that although the tunnels exist and the practice of shanghaiing was sometimes practiced in Portland, as elsewhere, there is no evidence that the tunnels were used for this.

In his book The Oregon Shanghaiers, Portland historian Barney Blalock traces the notion that the tunnels were used to shanghai sailors to a series of apocryphal stories that appeared in the newspaper The Oregonian in 1962, and the subsequent popularity of "Shanghai tunnel" tours that began in the 1970s. He says the tours were popular but misled visitors.

In 1990, local businessman Bill Naito was quoted in The Oregonian as saying that the tunnels are underneath "Northwest Couch, Davis and Everett streets".

The "Shanghai tunnels" are referenced many times in Grimm.

See also

 Vault lights, tunnel illumination
 Seattle Underground

References

Further reading

External links
Cascade Geographic Society, offers tours of the basements near the tunnels.

 

Geography of Portland, Oregon
History of Portland, Oregon
Northwest Portland, Oregon
Old Town Chinatown
Underground cities
Tourist attractions in Portland, Oregon